Jesper Guldbrandsen (born 25 November 1935) is a Danish field hockey player. He competed in the men's tournament at the 1960 Summer Olympics.

References

External links
 

1935 births
Living people
Danish male field hockey players
Olympic field hockey players of Denmark
Field hockey players at the 1960 Summer Olympics
Sportspeople from Copenhagen